Jack Philip Cannon (21 December 1929 – 24 December 2016) was a British composer and teacher. His choral music and songs have enjoyed extensive performances worldwide.

Brief biography 
Philip Cannon was born in Paris on 21 December 1929, to Franco-British parents.  The family moved to Falmouth in Cornwall in 1936, where Philip was educated at the local Grammar School.  Cannon subsequently studied with Imogen Holst at Dartington and with Gordon Jacob and Vaughan Williams at the Royal College of Music, where (in 1951) he was awarded the Octavia Travelling Scholarship.

In 1958 he became a lecturer in music at Sydney University, before returning to the Royal College in London in 1960 as Professor of Composition, a post which he held until his retirement in 1995.  He was appointed FRCM in 1971.

Cannon's String Quartet of 1964 won two international awards in France.  A number of high-profile commissions followed, including his work for 24 solo strings Oraison funèbre de l'âme humaine (1970) for French Radio, his choral work Son of Man (1975), commissioned by the BBC to mark the entry of the UK into the EEC, and three works of great beauty for the Three Choirs Festival: The Temple in 1974 (which later became a staple in the repertoire of the Bach Choir under David Willcocks), Lord of Light (1980), and A Ralegh Triptych (1992).  His Te Deum (1975) was the result of a personal commission from HM Queen Elizabeth II for a work to mark the 500th anniversary of St George's Chapel, Windsor Castle.

In 2011 Cannon donated his manuscripts and other archives to the Bodleian Library at Oxford; to mark this, the composer's Te Deum was sung at Christ Church Cathedral.

Cannon's other works include; three operas (Morvoren (1964), The Man from Venus (1967), and Dr Jekyll and Mr Hyde) (a commission for BBC TV, 1973), 2 symphonies, various instrumental pieces including his Concertino for piano & strings (1949), his clarinet quintet Logos (another BBC commission, 1977), and a Septain (1995) originally created for the pianist John Ogdon., together with a number of works for voice, notably his song cycles Songs to Delight (1950), and Six Birdsongs (1993).

Cannon's String Quartet, Clarinet Quintet and his string sextet Cinq supplications sur un benediction (1985) are all available on an Olympia CD.  The recording label Lyrita released a CD of Philip's works in 2017, including his Cinq Chansons de femme for soprano & harp (1952), together with his String Quartet and Lord of Light.  Recordings of performances of the Concertino, Three Rivers (1954), The Temple, Son of Man, Lord of Light, and Tip Toe Tango (1994) are also available on YouTube.

Cannon's first wife, Jacqueline, died in 1984. Cannon himself died, aged 87, on 24 December 2016 in the Florence Nightingale Hospice attached to Stoke Mandeville hospital.  He is survived by his second wife, Jane, whom he married in 1997, and by his daughter (by his first marriage) Virginia.

Musical style 

Cannon's first opera Morvoren premiered at the Royal College in 1964. Interviewed about this opera by The Times, the composer stated "I believe that a composer should feel free to build his style from everything that is available – microtones, note clusters, electronic oscillators and the chord of C major – and make a synthesis of all the means at his disposal if by so doing he can make an impact on his audience."

In their entry for Philip Cannon in Grove Music Online, Richard Cooke and Roderic Dunnett note that Cannon's "musical personality is characterized by a fierce individualism, reflected in his use of a forthright and uncompromising musical language. The expressive drive that he can achieve with that language, sometimes tonal, occasionally atonal, yet always direct and communicative, is evident throughout his work .. his works show an intensification of thought and an endeavour to assert the potentials of the human spirit that prompted one French critic to speak of Oraison Funèbre de l'Âme Humaine as 'avant-garde romantique'".

In his article on The Sacred Choral Music of Philip Cannon, Ronald Thomas describes Cannon as "making a strong creative contribution to choral tradition .. a world figure .. a masterly composer", and observes of Cannon's first Three Choirs' commission, The Temple that the work "demonstrates a real understanding of choral composition resulting in moments of rare beauty and sensitivity to Herbert's poetry, using a combination of strong counterpoint 'with moments of stillness and exquisite chording".

Thomas quotes Cannon himself describing the structure of his Ralegh Triptych:

List of works 

Operas
Morvoren, 1963
The Man from Venus, 1966–67
Dr Jekyll and Mr Hyde, 1973
Orchestra
Sinfonietta, (chamber orch) 1947
Spring, (orchestra), 1949
Piano Concertino, (piano & strings) 1949
Fanfares, (8 tpt, 6 trombones, tuba, perc) 1963
Oraison Funebre de l'ame humaine, (24 solo strings) 1970
Symphony, (orchestra) 1998–9
Choral
Songs to Delight, (SSA & strings) 1950
Fleeting Fancies, (SATB) 1953
Son of God, (double chorus) 1956
To Music, (SSSA & piano) 1960
Son of Science, (tenor, boys choir, perc, piano, strings) 1961
Idea, (SATB) 1964
En hiver, (SSSA) 1968
The Temple, (SSATB) 1974
Son of Man, (T, Bar, SATB, orch) 1975
Te Deum, (SATB, org, (state) tpt, orch) 1975
Lord of Light, (soprano, tenor, baritone, boys vv, SATB, org, orch) 1980
Missa Chorea, (solo vv, double semi-chorus, double chorus) 1984
A Ralegh Triptych, (SATB) 1989–91
Songs
Cinq Chansons de femme (soprano & harp) 1952
Cecilia, (1 voice & harp) 1953
River Lullaby, (soprano & piano) 1962
Three Rivers, (tenor & piano) 1963
Six Bird Songs, (coloraturas & piano) 1993
Le Mort, (baritone & piano) 1998
Instrumental
Two Rhapsodies, (piano) 1943
String Quartet, 1945
String Trio, 1945
Sextet, (flute, oboe and string quartet) 1945
Fantasia, (string quartet) 1946
Variations for two violins, 1946
Variations on a canto firmo, (violin) 1948
Galop Parisien, (two pianos) 1950
L'enfant s'amuse, (piano) 1954
Carillon, (harp) 1955
Carillon, (organ) 1955
Sonatine Champetre, (for piano) 1959
Sonata (two pianos) 1960
String Quartet, 1964
Jazz and Blues, (piano) 1970
Piano Trio, (piano, violin & cello) 1973–4
Clarinet Quintet, (clarinet & string quartet) 1977
Boutades Bourguignonnes, (piano) 1984
String Sextet, (2 violins, 2 violas, 2 cellos) 1985
Trois Chiffres, (piano) 1994
Carillon "Joyeux Noel" (harp) 1994
Septain (piano) 1995

References 
Notes

Sources
Cooke, Richard and Roderic Dunnett (n.d.). "Cannon, (Jack) Philip" in Oxford Music Online. . Retrieved 21 November 2016
Myers, Rolo (1965). "Philip Cannon: A Fresh Voice in British Music", The Musical Times, Vol. 106, No. 1473 (November 1965), pp. 858–860. . Retrieved 21 November 2016.

External links 
Philip Cannon, extensive list of works, essay

1929 births
Academics of the Royal College of Music
Alumni of the Royal College of Music
English classical composers
English male classical composers
English opera composers
2016 deaths
Male opera composers
Place of birth missing